Coenophlebia is a genus of neotropical charaxine butterflies in the family Nymphalidae, native to Colombia, Peru, Brazil, Bolivia and Ecuador. It is a monotypic genus. The single species is  Coenophlebia archidona.

The wingspan is about 90 mm. Adults mimic fallen leaves. They are attracted to decaying matter.

References

Anaeini
Monotypic butterfly genera
Fauna of Brazil
Nymphalidae of South America
Taxa named by Baron Cajetan von Felder
Taxa named by Rudolf Felder